Hani ( Hani,  Palimaden) is a district of Diyarbakır Province of Turkey. The population was 8,146 in 2010.

History 
The locals in Hani took part in the Sheikh Said rebellion in 1925. Subsequently, the town experienced special surveillance and scrutiny from the state.

Politics 
After the victory of the Democratic Regions Party (DBP) in the local elections in 2014, Hani became a hotspot for the women movement in Diyarbakır province. A women's center was opened in presence of the Metropolitan Mayor of Diyarbakır, Gültan Kişanak. The DBP mayor was dismissed over alleged links with the Kurdistan Workers' Party in October 2016 and a trustee was imposed by the Ministry of the interior. In the local elections of March 2019 Ibrahim Lale of the Justice and Development Party (AKP) was elected mayor.

References

Populated places in Diyarbakır Province
Districts of Diyarbakır Province
Kurdish settlements in Turkey